Nakhon Nayok is one of the central provinces (changwat) of Thailand, established by the Act Establishing Changwat Samut Prakan, Changwat Nonthaburi, Changwat Samut Sakhon, and Changwat Nakhon Nayok, Buddhist Era 2489 (1946), which came into force on 9 May 1946.

Neighboring provinces are (from north clockwise) Saraburi, Nakhon Ratchasima, Prachinburi, Chachoengsao, and Pathum Thani.
Nakhon Nayok is known for waterfalls and fruit varieties.

Nakon Nayok is a nearby province to Bangkok and has various tourist attractions. Khao Yai National Park, Thailands oldest national park is in partly in Nakhon Nayok province and attracts many tourists. Khun Dan Prakarn Chon Dam is another tourist attraction 2 hours outside of Bangkok in Nakhon Nayok.

Toponymy
The word nakhon originates from the Sanskrit word nagara (Devanagari:  नगर) meaning 'city', and the word nayok is thought to have been derived from the Sanskrit nāyaka (Devanagari:  नायक) meaning 'leader' or 'captain'. However, in this connection, na means '[tax of] rice field' and yok means 'exempted'. Hence the name of the province literally means 'tax-free city'.

History
The city of Nakhon Nayok dates back to the Dvaravati Kingdom, probably founded in the 11th century. Ruins from this time are visible at Mueang Boran Dong Lakhon south of the modern city. Originally named Mueang Lablae, the name "Nakhon Nayok" was assigned to it in 1350, when it became a garrison town of the Ayutthaya kingdom protecting the eastern boundary.
On 1 January 1943 the government downgraded Nakhon Nayok province and combined it with Prachinburi province, except for Ban Na district which became part of Saraburi province. On 9 May 1946 the province was re-established.

Symbols
The provincial seal shows an elephant holding an ear of rice with its trunk. This symbolizes fertile rice fields, as well as the forests with numerous elephants. In the background two piles of straw, trees, and clouds symbolizing the natural beauty of the province.

The provincial tree and flower is the silk cotton tree (Cochlospermum religiosum).

Climate
Nakhon Nayok province has a tropical savanna climate (Köppen climate classification category Aw). Winters are dry and warm. Temperatures rise until May. Monsoon season runs from May through October, with heavy rain and somewhat cooler temperatures during the day, although nights remain warm. Climate statistics: maximum temperature is 42.2 °C (108 °F) in April and lowest temperature is 12.2 °C (54 °F) in December. Highest average temperature is 36.8 °C (98.2 °F) in April and minimum average temperature is 20.5 °C (68.9 °F) in December. Average annual rainfall is 1,823 millimeters in 134 days. Maximum daily rainfall is 195 millimeters in August.

Geography

The northern part of the province is in the Sankamphaeng Range, the southern prolongation of the Dong Phaya Yen Mountains, with the highest elevation the 1,292-meter-high Yod Khao Kiew. Most of that area is covered by the Khao Yai National Park, along with three other national parks, make up region 1 (Prachinburi) of Thailand's protected areas. The central part of the province however is a rather flat river plain formed by the Nakhon Nayok River. The southern part of the province has relatively infertile acidic soil.

The main river of the province is the Nakhon Nayok River. It joins the Prachinburi River at Pak Nam Yothaka in Ban Sang district, Prachinburi province, which then becomes the Bang Pa Kong River.

Administrative divisions

Provincial government
The province is divided into four districts (amphoes). The districts are further divided into 41 subdistricts (tambons) and 403 villages (mubans).
Mueang Nakhon Nayok
Pak Phli
Ban Na
Ongkharak

Local government
As of 26 November 2019 there are: one Nakhon Nayok Provincial Administration Organisation and 6 municipal (thesaban) areas in the province. Nakhon Nayok has town (thesaban mueang) status. Further 5 subdistrict municipalities (thesaban tambon). The non-municipal areas are administered by 39 Subdistrict Administrative Organisations - SAO (ongkan borihan suan tambon).

Human achievement index 2017

Since 2003, United Nations Development Programme (UNDP) in Thailand has tracked progress on human development at sub-national level using the Human achievement index (HAI), a composite index covering all the eight key areas of human development. National Economic and Social Development Board (NESDB) has taken over this task since 2017.

References

External links

News and Information in Nakhon Nayok (thai)
Nakhon Nayok, Tourist Authority of Thailand
Website of province (Thai)
Khao Yai National Park

 
Provinces of Thailand